Zamagiria is a genus of small moths belonging to the snout moth family (Pyralidae).  They are part of the huge snout moth subfamily Phycitinae, but their exact relationships are obscure, and they are currently not assigned to a particular  tribe of Phycitinae.

This genus is almost exclusively found in the Neotropics. One species (Z. laidion) ranges north up to Florida, and one other (Z. exedra) was described from a specimen collected on Nuku Hiva in the Marquesas Islands. But the latter may simply have been accidentally introduced, being in reality a Neotropical species whose native range has not yet been discovered.

Zamagiria moths can usually be recognized in the field by their wing veins; the forewing has 11 veins (vein 7 is missing), and veins 4 and 5 almost connect at the base in the forewings, while on the hindwings veins 4 and 5 are connected along half of their entire length.

Species of Zamagiria include:
 Zamagiria australella (Hulst, 1900)
 Zamagiria dixolophella Dyar, 1914
 Zamagiria exedra Clarke, 1986
 Zamagiria kendalli Blanchard, 1970
 Zamagiria laidion (Zeller, 1881)

Footnotes

References
  (1986): Pyralidae and Microlepidoptera of the Marquesas Archipelago. Smithsonian Contributions to Zoology 416: 1-485. PDF fulltext (214 MB!)
  (2003): Markku Savela's Lepidoptera and some other life forms – Zamagiria. Version of 203-MAY-04. Retrieved 2011-MAY-28.

Phycitinae
Moths of South America
Pyralidae genera